Acianthera aculeata is a species of orchid native to Ecuador.

References 

aculeata
Flora of Ecuador